Ue... paisano! is a 1953 Argentine film directed by Manuel Romero starring Susana Campos, Nicola Paone, Fidel Pintos and Vicente Rubino. Nicola Panoe sang a song with the same title.

References

External links
 

1953 films
1950s Spanish-language films
Argentine black-and-white films
1950s Argentine films